Heinz Günthardt and Markus Günthardt were the defending champions, but both players decided to compete at Hilversum in the same week, partnering different players.

Mark Edmondson and John Fitzgerald won the title by defeating Anders Järryd and Hans Simonsson 2–6, 7–5, 6–0 in the final.

Seeds

Draw

Draw

References

External links
 Official results archive (ATP)
 Official results archive (ITF)

Men's Doubles
Doubles